Bolloré is a surname derived from bod which means bush and lore which means laurel in Breton.

Notable people with the surname include:

 Gwenn-Aël Bolloré (1925–2001), French soldier, businessman, author, and publisher
 Thierry Bolloré (born 1963), French executive
 Vincent Bolloré (born 1952), French industrialist, corporate raider and businessman
 Yannick Bolloré (born 1980), French businessman, son of Vincent Bolloré

Breton-language surnames